The Anglican Diocese of Owerri is one of 12 within the Anglican Province of Owerri, itself one of 14 provinces within the Church of Nigeria. The  current bishop is Chukwuma Oparah.

Notes

Church of Nigeria dioceses
Dioceses of the Province of Owerri